The LIU Sharks football program represents Long Island University in college football at the NCAA Division I Football Championship Subdivision (formerly Division I-AA) level. The Sharks are members of the Northeast Conference and play their home games in the 6,000 seat Bethpage Federal Credit Union Stadium.

History

Long Island University Blackbirds 
College football was first played at Long Island University's Brooklyn campus for six seasons from the late 1920s to 1940 when the program was suspended "until the world situation stabilized." Under head coach Herbert Raubenheimer, who also coached the LIU Brooklyn Blackbirds men's basketball, the team won their opening game on September 29, 1928 against Rider. Clair Bee took over head coaching duties in the 1931 season before the program was suspended during the heart of the Great Depression. Bee remained at the university, coaching basketball and returned to the gridiron to coach the team from 1939 to 1940. After playing at several local venues in the early seasons, the Blackbirds called Ebbets Field home for the 1939 and 1940 seasons. Over the six pre-war seasons the Blackbirds went 9–17–1.

LIU Post Pioneers 

In 1951 LIU purchased the C.W. Post estate to develop a suburban LIU campus due to increased post-war suburban expansion. LIU reinstated the football program in 1957 on the university's new campus in Brookville, New York and football joined the sport offerings at C.W. Post College in the 1957 season.

On October 3, 2018, Long Island University announced that it was unifying the athletic programs of its two campuses into one Division I program, effective with the 2019–20 academic year. The new program's nickname of Sharks was announced on May 15, 2019. The LIU Sharks inherited the Northeast Conference membership of the Brooklyn campus. As part of the merger, football and several other Division II LIU Post teams for sports that had not been sponsored by LIU Brooklyn immediately moved to Division I without the usual transition period for an institution moving to a different division.

In the final season as the LIU Post Pioneers, the team reached the NCAA Division II Playoffs where they were defeated in the first round by Slippery Rock. They finished ranked at No. 21 in the Division II Coaches' Poll and received the 2019 Division II Lambert Cup from the Eastern College Athletic Conference (ECAC) and Metropolitan New York Football Writers, signifying them as the best football team in the East in Division II football.

LIU Sharks 
The Sharks finished winless in their first season. A month after the season ended, starting quarterback Clay Beathard was stabbed to death in Nashville, Tennessee.

Affiliations

Classifications

Conference memberships

Conference championships
LIU has won 18 conference championships, four shared and 14 outright.

† Co-champions

Postseason history

Bowl games 
LIU participated in one NCAA College Division level bowl games, going 0–1.

NCAA Division III Playoffs 
LIU participated in the NCAA Division III Playoffs as C.W. Post.

NCAA Division II Playoffs 
LIU participated in the NCAA Division II Playoffs as LIU Post.

Future non-conference opponents 
Announced schedules as of February 1, 2020.

Home stadium

The Sharks play their home games at Bethpage Federal Credit Union Stadium in Brookville, New York. The stadium was upgraded to meet NCAA Division I requirements as part of the program's elevation to D-I. The visiting stands were demolished and replaced with larger stands that mirror the home side; the expansion brought the capacity up to 6,000 seats.

References

External links 
 Official website

 
American football teams established in 2019
2019 establishments in New York (state)